Computer technology for developing areas is often through the donation of technology to developing areas. Many institutions, government, charitable, and for-profit organizations require technology development often involving hardware or software design, and the coordination of donors, distributors, and deployers.  Technical development overlaps with the fields of technical training, maintenance and support.

Opportunity

 
Developing countries lag behind other nations in terms of ready access to the internet, though computer access has started to bridge that gap.  Access to computers, or to broadband access, remains rare for half of the world's population.  For example, as of 2010, on average of only one in 130 people in Africa had a computer while in North America and Europe one in every two people had access to the Internet.  90% of students in Africa had never touched a computer.
 
Local networks can provide significant access to software and information even without utilizing an internet connection, for example through use of the Wikipedia CD Selection or the eGranary Digital Library.

Focusing on Africa

Exploring the introduction of computer technology in Africa
 
Africa presents a unique cultural climate for the introduction of computer technology not only because of its diverse population, varied geography and multifaceted issues but also because of it singular challenges. Africa is composed of 53 countries many gaining independence since 1950 containing 75 unique ethnic groups and approximately 700 million people. It has been colonized and hence influenced strongly by Europeans from France, Portugal, Britain, Spain, Italy and Belgium except for the countries of Ethiopia and Liberia. Martin & O'Meara  describe Africa's diversity and some of the issues that it presents: ethnicity, geography, rural/urban life styles, family life (class levels), access to developed world products, education, and media.
 
Despite this somewhat overwhelming diversity in Africa, the need for self-determination by Africans as fought for example by the Nigerian's five Ogoni clans during the 1990s over oil rights is paramount. The "bare necessities of life – water, electricity, roads, education and a right to self-determination so that we can be responsible for our resources and our environment"  must be respected. Technology such as computers is considered by some to be important in obtaining such self-determination for Africa especially in the area of education. While it has already had an extreme boost through the independence of many of the African countries, more education can lead to water, electricity, roads and more self-determination. Bill Clinton supports the use of technology in education stating, "[s]o, I think that the potential of information technology to empower individuals, promote growth, reduce inequality, increase government capacity, and make citizen interaction with government work better is enormous" And at the same forum, Bill Gates further states, "Out of 6 billion people, somewhat less than 1 billion are using this technology. ... Part of how to do that is by having community access, getting it into schools and libraries, and many of the projects we've done, both here in Africa and around the world have that theme that, although it won't be in the home at first, it will be accessible."

South Africa and the Smart Cape Access Project

South Africa has one of the largest and most successful introductions of computers to the residents in Africa with the Smart Cape Access Project initiated in 2000 in Cape Town winning the Bill and Melinda Gates Foundation Access to Learning Award in 2003 (Valentine, 2004. The project piloted 36 computers in six public libraries in disadvantages areas of Cape Town in 2002 with four computers designated for public use for each library. Libraries had the important structure with security, electricity and telephone connections, and known access by the public. Cape Town City Council sought information from librarians to build their project realizing that free Internet access was critical to the projects success including training, a user guide, help desk support and feedback loop. They anticipated that Internet access would "create much-needed jobs for citizens, but ... it can empower people to market themselves, start their own businesses, or gain access to useful information". Funding for the project relied on donations and partnerships from private organizations with extensive volunteer help in accessing open-source software that is available from licensed vendors or free on the Internet. While the project has been plagued by slow Internet speeds, long lines of waiting users, hacking and budgets, the demand for more computers remains high. Residents have used Internet access to build their own businesses using Smart Cape for administration, to obtain jobs sometimes over seas, to create some unsanctioned small-scale ventures such as paying an educated user to write one's resume, to write letters, e-mail, play games, complete homework and do research, and to obtain information such as BMW advertisements among other uses. Older people, unemployed youth and school children have been the most prevalent users of the Internet with 79 percent being men.

With the first phase of the project completed in 2005 and the second phase consisting of monitoring and evaluation of pilot sites just completed in 2007, the roll out of the final phase of the project is underway. Over one hundred thousand people have made use of the Smart Cape Access Project computers' free access since 2002 (Brown, 2007) which is about one fifth increase in overall access to the Internet for the 3.2 million population of Cape Town increasing total access to 17 percent of the residents in 2008 (Mokgata, 2008). However, the project continues to be plagued by budget issues leading to questions about long-term sustainability because of its heavy reliance on donations and volunteers.  The project reports did not address the maintenance of the computers or the network which could also be a rather large expenditure. Of further concern is the lack of use by women and girls, which culturally presents a hierarchy problem because men are the public face, and another topic to consider in the future.

Africa and other less successful projects

Unlike the Smart Cape Access Project, many other projects that attempt to introduce computers to Africa fail not only in the sustainability issue but also in training, support and feedback. Although in many cases access to the Internet via cable or wireless and electricity remain overwhelming issues. Less than one percent of Africans access broadband and only four percent use the Internet according to the BGBC in an article about Intel backing wireless access in Africa. The cost of wireless remains prohibitive to most Africans and possibly more important is that there is not an overall "education model" that supports how to integrate forms of hardware to provide the wireless network.

Kenya provides an example pursuing the use of fiber optic cable to connect to the Internet thus being able to lower access costs from $7,500 a satellite-delivered megabyte to $400 from present levels. The Alcatel-Lucent project started at the end of 2007 (two year delivery date) and will piggyback on the expansion of electricity to many rural villages providing Internet access. It will also provide speed that is currently lacking with the satellite connection.

Freeplay Foundation has attempted to address the issue of electricity by first developing battery powered lights for rural areas of Africa piloting a project also in Kenya in 2008."The World Bank estimates that more than 500 million people in sub-Saharan Africa do not have access to electricity supplies that could be used to light their homes" or power computers.  Freeplay has also provided a distribution system through women that will provide income in selling, repair and maintenance for customers and is prototyping in Kenya early in 2008. While purchasing the lights may pose a sustainability issue, such inventions could be hopefully tapped for future powering of computers in Africa.

An example of further difficulties surrounding introducing computers in Africa is found in the study of Mozambique one of the poorest nations of the world with 60 percent of its population below the poverty line. Despite their poverty, Mozambicans view their education and access to the Internet as only second to obtaining enough food to eat. This is shown in statistics that identify the increase in computers per hundred inhabitants from .08 to 1.6 in just two years between 1996 and 1998. However, in non urban areas where better off residents might make 40 to 60 US dollars a month, access to the Internet could eat up half of their income so community-owned settings have been instituted with some unknown success. Other pilot programs are also proliferating across the country with unknown results at this time. This lack of data regarding the overall implementation of computers in Mozambique highlights the sustainability issue of computers in Africa as does the following example in Cameroon.

Cameroon was the recipient of the School of Engineering and Applied Science communication technology through a student volunteer organization. Computers were obtained, shipped, refurbished and integrated with teaching computer skills to residents. A recipient was the Presbyterian Teachers Training College which interacts with primary and secondary schools. However, no maintenance or support procedures and facilities were available as part of this effort and information on the continued value of the project are unavailable. Similarly but on a larger scale, Computer Aid, a British charity, has shipped over 30,000 PCs to 87 developing companies and is currently shipping at a rate of 1,000 a month. While it refurbishes donated computers before shipping, it appears to have not follow up to the placement of computers. However, Rwanda seems to be eager to have these computers and is providing a government sponsored Information and Communication Technology policy with access to computers through schools, community and health projects.

While all of these projects are admirable, successful introduction of computers to Africa necessitates more of the United Nations' Millennium Development goals approach which has been agreed to by countries and leading development institutions around the world to promote a comprehensive and coordinated approach to tackling many problems in developing countries ("Microsoft technology, partnerships", 2006). However, by 2008 Bill Gates had changed his perspective on technology solving problems in Africa stating, "I mean, do people have a clear view of what it means to live on $1 a day? ... He openly dismisses the notion that the world's poorest people constitute a significant market for high-tech products anytime soon. ...the world's poorest two billion people desperately need health care right now, not laptops". Here the dilemma is introduced to the mix of feeding people from handouts or providing tools for their own self-determination. As a proponent of self-determination not excluding the benefit of philanthropy, a review of projects discussed above and others merged with the successful Fisher approach to KickStart International could provide a framework for more successful introduction of computers to Africa, possibly skipping to first world technology.

Martin Fisher: a possible business plan

Martin Fisher started KickStart International with Nick Moon in 1991 as a "non-profit organization that develops and markets new technologies for use in Africa". It develops technologies advocating understanding the cultural factors surrounding making money in Africa rather than an approach of giving away technology with expertise that has little to do with Africa's ability to make a living. Moon and Fisher believe that "the poor people don't need handouts, they need concrete opportunities to use their skills and initiative". Fisher further states that "our approach is to design, market, and sell simple tools that poor entrepreneurs buy and use to create profitable new small businesses and earn a decent income". He also stresses the need to build tools that can be supported in Africa using limited materials and assembly methods. They have designed and marketed a number of tools focusing on farming in African countries of Kenya, Tanzania and Mali because 80 percent of the poor are farmers having only two assets: land and the skill of farming. For example, KickStart had created a Hip Pump selling for $34.00 allowing a farmer to use the motion of her or his hips against a lever as a drive mechanism. The pump is capable of lifting water from six meters below the ground to 13 meters above it to allow a farmer to irrigate about three-quarters of an acre in eight hours. Other technologies have included pressing oil seeds, making building blocks from compacted soil, baling hay and producing a latrine cover. These technologies are being mass-produced in Africa. The company has successfully sold over 63,000 pumps (Perlin, 2006) and estimates that 42,000 new micro-enterprises have been started using KickStart equipment such as this pump generating more than 42 million US dollars per year in new profits and wages. Fisher and Moon further estimate that they have helped 200,000 people escape from poverty. They have been successful in Africa because they have focused on:

1. Understanding the culture and environment.
2. Providing income producing tools to create new wealth.
3. Building tools that can be supported in the environment.

While KickStart has not talked something as technically challenging as computers, its business plan can be easily adapted to the introduction of computers in Africa. For example, the Smart Cape Access Project has shown widespread success understanding the culture and environment of Cape Town, but still is concerned about sustainability and use by women. Most notable, the project needs to consider how access to the Internet can provide income producing tools to create new wealth and pursue a better maintenance plan. Also of importance is inclusion of women and girls' positive impact in the roll out of technologies for the eventual introduction of computers to Africa.

Sources of hardware

Inexpensive new computers initiatives
Initiatives such as the OLPC computer and Sakshat Tablet are intended to provide rugged technology at a price affordable for mass deployments.  The World Bank surveyed the available ICT (Information and communication technologies for development) devices in 2010.  The Raspberry Pi is a single-board computers used to promote low-cost educational computing and interfacing applications.

Electronic waste statistics Press Release

Unep, NEMA and Uganda Cleaner Production Centre
Uganda typically has both repair and refurbishers of computers.  In some countries charitable NPOs can give tax-deductible donation receipts for computers they're able to refurbish or otherwise reuse. Increased use of technology especially in ICT, low initial cost, and unplanned obsolescence of electrical and electronic equipment has led to an e-waste generation problem for Uganda. A Joint Team from UNEP, NEMA and UCPC, Estimate the current e-waste generated in Uganda at 10,300 tonnes from refrigerators, 3,300 tonnes from TVs, 2,600 tonnes from personal computers, 300 tonnes from printers and 170 tonnes from mobile phones.
However, as a result of the ban of used electronics, the accumulation of e-waste from 2010 to 2011 has reduced by a percentage of 40%
An e-learning strategy is being developed consultatively involving various stakeholders in the environment sector which yet Uganda has no e-waste recycler with capacity to cab down the problem of accumulation of e-waste.
List of Charitable organisations
 multi-national – Digital Partnership
 multi-national – InterConnection
 multi-national – Non-Profit Computing, Inc. (a United Nations advisor)
 multi-national – World Computer Exchange
 Ireland – Camara
 Japan – IDCE
 Norway, Denmark and Sweden – FAIR (Fair Allocation of Infotech Resources)
 UK – Computers 4 Africa
 UK – Digital Pipeline
 Computers for African Schools
 Computer Aid International
 Digital Links International
 UK – IT Schools Africa
 US (some multi-national) – TechSoup Global

Microsoft Corporation has a global list of approximately 1,800 Registered Refurbishers - however, the size of these refurbishers varies very greatly.

Problems encountered

Technology leaders like Microsoft co-founder Bill Gates argue that developing areas have more pressing needs than computer technology:

"'Fine, go to those Bangalore Infosys centres, but just for the hell of it go three miles aside and go look at the guy living with no toilet, no running water,' Gates says... 'The world is not flat and PCs are not, in the hierarchy of human needs, in the first five rungs.'"

A 2010 research report from the Governance and Social Development Resource Centre found "Very few ICT4D activities have proved sustainable... Recent research has stressed the need to shift from a technology-led approach, where the emphasis is on technical innovation towards an approach that emphasises innovative use of already established technology (mobiles, radio, television)."  However, of 27 applications of ICTs for development, E-government, E-learning and E-health were found to be possible of great success, as well as the strengthening of social networks and boosting of security (particularly of women).

One key problem is the ability of the recipients to maintain the donated technology and teach others its use.

Another significant problem can be the selection of software installed on technology – instructors trained in one set of software (for example Ubuntu) can be expected to have difficulty in navigating computers donated with different software (for example Windows XP).

A pressing problem is also the misuse of electronic waste in dangerous ways.  Burning technology to obtain the metals inside will release toxic fumes into the air.  (Certification of recyclers to e-Stewards or R2 Solutions standards is intended to preclude environmental pollution.)

Finally, while the training, support, hardware and software may all be donated, it is rare for another vital component of technology, Internet access, to be made available at a discounted rate.  "In about half the countries in Africa, one year of [dial-up] Internet supply will cost more than the average annual income."

See also
 Basel Action Network
 Community informatics
 Community technology center / Telecentre
 Computers and the environment
 E-cycling
 Electronic waste by country
 Electronic Waste Recycling Act (disambiguation)
 Green computing
 Index of recycling articles
 Non-profit technology
 NTAP (nonprofit technology assistance provider)
 Personal computer
 Plockton High School (Computers for Africa)
 Streetlites (African charity)
 United Nations Information and Communication Technologies Task Force
 Waste Electrical and Electronic Equipment Directive

References

External links
 Computer Refurbishment Centre Opens for Business in Kampala (6/12/2008)
 Affordable handheld computer reaches Latin America (5/4/2009)
 Where to donate and recycle old computer equipment

Science and technology in Africa